Gerard Steenson (c. 1957 – 14 March 1987) was an Irish republican paramilitary combatant, and leader of the Irish People's Liberation Organization during The Troubles.

Early life and career
A Catholic, the son of Frank Steenson, he was born in 1957 and raised in heavily republican West Belfast. Nicknamed "Doctor Death" by the media and by the Royal Ulster Constabulary for the multiple assassinations he purportedly accomplished according to The New York Times However Fortnight alleges that he got his nickname after he dressed up in a white coat to attack British soldiers guarding a patient at the Royal Victoria Hospital.

Steenson was widely associated with internecine violence between Irish republican groups. He joined the Official IRA's C Company in 1972 at the age of 14. Two years later, he left to join the INLA upon that paramilitary group's formation, consequent to their split from the Official IRA. He became head of the INLA in Belfast.

Steenson first came to notoriety in 1975 for killing Billy McMillen, the Official IRA's Belfast leader, during the feud between the INLA and the Official IRA when he was just 16 years of age. Jim Cusack, a journalist describes him as the "assassin-in-chief" of Hugh Torney.

In 1985, he was convicted of 67 terrorist offences (including six murders) after his former friend Harry Kirkpatrick testified against him. Kirkpatrick and Steenson were rarely seen apart in public and were given the nicknames "Pinkie and Perky".

Creating the IPLO
In 1986, Steenson, Jimmy Brown, Martin "Rook" O'Prey and others formed the Irish People's Liberation Organisation (IPLO) with the express intention of wiping out the INLA and IRSP which they viewed as becoming "corrupt" and an obstacle to "the fight for socialism" and "Irish freedom". He argued in letters, written while he was in prison in the early 1980s, that the INLA had become militarily "inefficient" and "undisciplined", which had led, as he wrote, to its involvement in criminality and sectarian attacks.

He was involved in the Rosnaree Hotel shooting

Reputation
He was viewed highly in the movement with Brown calling him a "committed and highly efficient military activist and a dedicated revolutionary". However he was described by Lord Justice Carswell as "a most dangerous and sinister terrorist. A ruthless and highly dedicated, resourceful and indefatigable planner of criminal exploits who did not hesitate to take a leading role in assassinations and other crimes". Henry McDonald and Jack Holland write "Both his friends and enemies spoke in a tone of awestruck at his paramilitary abilities". Ken Wharton refers to him as a "notorious psychopath". Sean O'Callaghan describes Steenson as someone who "never took to orders".

Terry George wrote of him that he "was extremely clever and even wittier than Billy McMillan. He had an angelic face and women adored him. He was also ruthless, cunning and fearless.".

Death
In 1987, Steenson and fellow IPLO volunteer, Tony "Boot" McCarthy, were ambushed and killed, presumably by an INLA active unit, while travelling in a car along Springhill Avenue, in Ballymurphy, Belfast after a night of drinking. An INLA spokesperson said Steenson was killed for being "actively involved in continuous and concerted efforts to undermine the authority of the ... movement.' Jimmy Brown gave the graveside oration. Two revenge killings of INLA members followed before the end of the feud.

In 1992, the Provisional IRA, through a series of assassinations and other actions, forced the disbandment of the IPLO.

See also
 "The Troubles"
 The Anglo-Irish Agreement

References

1950s births
1987 deaths
Date of birth missing
Deaths by firearm in Northern Ireland
Irish National Liberation Army members
Irish People's Liberation Organisation
Irish republicans
People killed by the Irish National Liberation Army
Republicans imprisoned during the Northern Ireland conflict